Heroes of the Saddle is a 1940 American Western "Three Mesquiteers" B-movie directed by William Witney.

Cast
 Robert Livingston as Stony Brooke
 Raymond Hatton as Rusty Joslin
 Duncan Renaldo as Renaldo
 Patsy Parsons as Peggy Bell (as Patsy Lee Parsons)
 Loretta Weaver as Ruth Miller
 Byron Foulger as Melloney
 William Royle as J. D. Crone
 Vince Barnett as Zach
 Jack Roper as Boxer 'Killer' McCully
 Reed Howes as Henchman Wilson
 Ethyl May Halls as Miss Dobbs (as Ethel May Halls)
 Al Taylor as Henchman Hendricks
 Patsy Carmichael as Annie

References

External links

1940 films
1940 Western (genre) films
American Western (genre) films
1940s English-language films
American black-and-white films
Films directed by William Witney
Republic Pictures films
Three Mesquiteers films
1940s American films